A list of films produced in Pakistan in 1970 (see 1970 in film) and in the Urdu language:

1970

See also
 1970 in Pakistan

References

External links
 Search Pakistani film - IMDB.com

1970
Pakistani
Films